Edgar Mary Sevilla Sarmiento (born January 12, 1959, Catbalogan, Samar, Philippines) is a member of the Philippine House of Representatives representing the 1st Legislative District of Samar from 2016 to 2022.

Early career (2000–2016)
Sarmiento was born in Catbalogan, Samar to Engr. Oscar Sarmiento of Calbayog City and Teresita Sevilla of Roxas City. 
He is an engineer by profession. He translates the broad concept of nation-building by focusing on the country’s foundations – the Filipino people. His advocacies are poverty alleviation, agriculture development, quality affordable healthcare, eradication of prohibited drugs, adequate and needed infrastructure, and continuous modernization of the assets of the Philippine National Police and the Armed Forces of the Philippines. He is also advocating for the legislation of a continuous roadmap for airport and railway infrastructure modernization. He is the brother of former Department of Interior and Local Government (DILG) Secretary Mel Senen S. Sarmiento, who was also Representative of the 1st District of Samar from 2010 to 2016.
 
Prior to his entry into politics, Rep. Edgar Sarmiento was president and CEO of Oscar R. Sarmiento Construction, Inc. Rep. Sarmiento has built a solid first-term in Congress. His legislative accomplishments include RA10931 which promotes universal access to quality tertiary education; RA11223 which provides Universal Health Care for all Filipinos; RA 11228 which provides for the mandatory PhilHealth coverage of all persons with disability (PWD); RA11055 which establishes the Filipino Identification System; RA10928 which extends the validity of the Philippine Passport; RA10930 which provides for a 5-year validity of Driver’s License; and RA11200 which provides for the rank classification in the Philippine National Police, among others.
 
He was a member of the Philippine Delegation to the 2017 ASEAN Inter-Parliamentary Assembly or AIPA and Secretary of the 13th Meeting of the AIPA Fact-Finding Committee (AIFOCOM) to Combat the Drug Menace. He was also part of the Philippine Delegation to the 1st Meeting of the AIPA Advisory Council on Dangerous Drugs (AIPACODD) in Singapore. Rep. Sarmiento obtained his Bachelor of Science in Civil Engineering from the Cebu Institute of Technology.

House of Representatives (2016–2022)

While in Congress, he authored and co-authored several house bills and republic acts, namely: 
House Bill No. 0092 – Immediate disqualification of Convicted Officials
RA10931 - Promotes universal access to quality tertiary education
RA11223 - Provides Universal Health Care for all Filipinos
RA11228 - Provides for the mandatory Philhealth coverage of all persons with disability (PWD)
RA11164 – Increases the monthly pension of senior veterans
JR00001 - Increase in Base Pay of Military and Uniformed Personnel in the Government
RA11055 - Establishing the Filipino Identification System
RA 10928 - Extends the validity of Philippine Passport
RA10930 – Provides 5-year validity of Driver’s License 
RA11200 – Provides for the rank classification in the Philippine National Police
RA11214 - Establishes a sports complex known as the "National Sports Training Center
RA11035 - Institutionalizing the Balik Scientist Program
RA11229 - Provides for the Special Protection of Child Passengers in motor vehicles
RA11188 - Provides for the Special Protection of Children in situations of armed conflict
RA11232 - Revised Corporation Code of the Philippines
RA11285 - Institutionalizing an energy efficiency and conservation program
RA11215 - Institutionalizing a national integrated cancer control program
RA 109621 - Gift Check Act of 2017

House Committee Membership (2016-2022)

House Committee Chair on Transportation

During his time as a member of Congress, Sarmiento was the Vice Chairman of the Commission on Transportation

In November 2018, together with then house committee transportation chairman Rep. Cesar Sarmiento from Catanduanes. They visited Bogota and met with Bogota Mayor Enrique Penalosa to discuss the TransMilenio BRT system hoping that they would be able to bring the system to the Philippines.

In August 2019, he was appointed as House Commission on Transportation.

Other appointments
HOUSE MEASURES
Vice-Chairman, Committee on Dangerous Drugs
Vice-Chairman, Committee on Transportation
Vice-Chairman, Committee on Welfare of Children
Member, Committee on Agriculture and Food
Member, Committee on Appropriations
Member, Committee on Health
Member, Committee on Housing and Urban Development
Member, Committee on Public Order and Safety
Member, Committee on Public Works and Highways
Member, Committee on Visayas Development
Member, Congressional Oversight Committee on Civil Aviation Authority of the Philippines

References 

Living people
Members of the House of Representatives of the Philippines from Samar (province)
1959 births
Liberal Party (Philippines) politicians
National Unity Party (Philippines) politicians
21st-century Filipino businesspeople
Filipino civil engineers
People from Catbalogan